Paul Tangi Mhova Mkondo (23 December 1945 – 9 May 2013) was a Zimbabwean nationalist, part of the first group of Gonakudzingwa restriction camp political prisoners, Pioneer Insurance Executive, Business magnate, Academic, philanthropist, conservationist, pioneer Indigenous businessman and entrepreneur.

Early life :1945-1954 
Mkondo was born of Karanga heritage in 1945 in Fort Victoria, (now Masvingo). He was the third born in a family of 18 children, the second son of Tangi Mkondo. Paul grew up in Nerupiri Village in Gutu a district of Masvingo Province. He later moved with his father Tangi Mhova Mkondo, who was a very hard-working & disciplined farm manager (who was asked by the white farm owner to relocate with him because he trusted & respected his work ethics), to Schoora Estate in Marandellas (now Marondera) in Mashonaland East Province.

Education and training 1955-1964 
Mkondo did his Sub A (Grade 1) to Standard One (Grade 3) at Schoora Estate Primary School. After Standard One, Mkondo moved to another farm in Wedza, which became known as Edridge (Duva) Estate where he worked as a stable boy looking after horses, and then became the butler. During this time his father Tangi Mhova Mkondo joined fellow migrants recruited by Witswatersrand Native Labour Association (WNLA/ WENELA) to catch the Stimela train to work in the gold mines of Johannesburg, South Africa. This was in order to pay for the controversial hut tax imposed upon black Rhodesians (Zimbabwe) by the colonial government, as traditional subsistence farming did not generate enough income to afford the tax. Mkondo had to work to support his mother and the rest of his siblings at a very young age. During the weekend he started weekend business of trading at the local market. He later went to Chemhanza Mission in Wedza a district of Mashonaland East Province, from 1957 to complete his primary education from Standard Two (Grade 4) to Standard Six. Mkondo then went to high school at Tegwani Mission near Bulawayo in Matabeleland South Province. At Tegwani Mission (now Thekwane High School) he met future fellow nationalists such as Canaan Banana and Edson Zvobgo. Mkondo was also classmates with union leader Gibson Sibanda. Mkondo as the Headboy led the biggest student protest against the Rhodesian Unilateral Declaration of Independence (UDI) in 1965. This resulted in him being black-listed and outlawed, resulting in him being one of the first political detainees at Gonakudzingwa Restriction camp alongside Joshua Nkomo. Mkondo during school vacations, used to enjoy the Outward Bound Camps, which were held at the Outward Bound Mountaineering Centre in Melsetter (now Chimanimani) in Manicaland Province. He became a part-time instructor which helped him self-finance his Secondary Education.Mkondo during this time also trained individuals on bushcraft, scouting and how to survive in the bush and became elite SAS special forces worldwide.

Mkondo went on to become a full-time "Outward Bound Instructor" where he trained another future nationalist, Moven Mahachi, who later on was to confide in him in planning the escape of Robert Mugabe and Tezvara (In-Law) Edgar Tekere to Mozambique alongside Chief Rekayi Tangwena (whom he had befriended as an Outward Bound instructor) with the assistance of Samora Machel's FRELIMO party. After a few years as an Outward bound Instructor and Scout in the Eastern Highlands, Mkondo decided to continue his education. He enrolled at Bulawayo Polytechnic College to train in hotel catering, a course that was sponsored by the Rhodesian Breweries (Natbrew) and Anglo American Corporation. He was one of two black students accepted at the time for this course. The student who achieved the highest marks was to be offered a scholarship to study for a Bachelor of Science degree in Hotel Management at Blackpool Technical College (now Blackpool and The Fylde College) in the United Kingdom. Mkondo came first among the other students in the course, but was not offered the scholarship because of his colour. This was his first personal taste of racial discrimination, as he believed the scholarship was a lifetime opportunity to help him provide for his family. Mkondo then relocated to Highfields Harare, obtaining a job with the prestigious Park Lane Hotel in Salisbury as an assistant kitchen manager. Due to an altercation with some soldiers at a wedding, Mkondo was fired and later barred from future employment at any catering establishment. He sought out another job at Salisbury's Federal Hotel, but again cited discrimination by the predominantly Coloured guests.

Entrepreneurship and businesses establishment 1965-1969 

Mkondo decided to open his own business in Lochinvar, and purchased the Club Hideout 99 with approval from the Rhodesian Liquor Licensing Board and the municipal authorities. This site later became an important meeting site for supporters of the Zimbabwe African National Union (ZANU), and stored weapons for the party's militant wing, the Zimbabwe African National Liberation Army (ZANLA). Mkondo also participated in a series of urban bombings, such as the sabotage of petrol installations in Epworth. Throughout the 1960s, he worked as an insurance & financial advisor. His business acumen and strong work ethic set off his entrepreneurial spirit which made him start a garage and taxi business in Machipisa, Highfields. Mkondo eventually founded his own taxi company, Sharaude Glen Noah Taxi Services (Pvt) Ltd, which came to own the second largest taxi fleet in Rhodesia. At some point he also served as president of the country's Metered Taxi Operators' Association.

Political activity 1970-1980 

Mkondo organised underground meetings for some of the political leadership, as many were his former teachers and colleagues from Thekwani High School in Plumtree. Some he had known since he had lived with them in Highfields Township in Salisbury (now Harare). When the Rhodesian Bush War intensified after 1972, Mkondo sent his wife abroad for medical training with ZANLA. Mkondo intended to close his business and follow her into exile, but was dissuaded by Herbert Chitepo and ZANLA commander Josiah Tongogara, who recommended he stay inside Rhodesia and assist with the postwar economic reconstruction when hostilities ende He was, however, appointed to ZANU's Treasury and Finances Committee in recognition of his sympathy to the nationalist cause. On the committee, Mkondo worked closely with fellow ZANU supporters Enos Nkala, Bernard Chidzero, George Tawengwa, Ben Mucheche, Tobias Musariri Snr. and others to funnel money to ZANLA for arms. He was also utilised as a liaison between the ZANU leadership detained in Gonakudzingwa restriction camp by the Rhodesian Security Forces, and those such as Mugabe, who had fled to Mozambique. With no travel restrictions, and being a well-known successful businessman in Southern Africa, Mkondo took trips abroad to promote ZANU's cause with international figures such as US President Gerald Ford, diplomats Henry Kissinger, Andrew Young and Pope John Paul II. He was instrumental in persuading the Ford administration to push for talks which resulted in the 1976 Geneva talks between black nationalists and Rhodesian prime minister Ian Smith.

Following the election of Mugabe as prime minister in March 1980, Mkondo helped many former guerrilla fighters re-integrate into civilian life. Mkondo was the favoured people’s candidate to represent Zanu PF for the Gutu South parliamentary seat in Masvingo Province where he was born and raised. Instead, Shuvai Mahofa due to gender equality issues was selected by the Gutu Zanu Pf Provincial leadership led by Vice President of Zimbabwe, Dr. Simon Muzenda, which Mkondo cordially accepted and then fully supported her tenure, as she was a Clans woman (VaTete) and an able politician. Mkondo in terms of international business, turned down many executive opportunities to work in Fortune 500 and FTSE 100 Index multi-national companies overseas , opting to remain in the new Zimbabwe.

Indigenous commercial farming :1980-2013 
Paul Mkondo was an established commercial farmer. He started farming Zimbabwe's staple maize in the late 1970s in Lochinvar and Southerton in Harare. He also was the first indigenous commercial poultry farmer to have his own brand: Paul Mkondo Poultry. In the mid 1980s, Mkondo purchased Inyatsi Farm at competitive commercial agricultural property market rates at that time, from a white farmer in the Mazowe, Mashonaland Central  area. He joined the Commercial Farmers' Union (CFU), and was one of the founding members of the Indigenous Commercial Farmers Union (ICFU), formed in 1992 to represent black commercial farmers.

Mkondo, as Vice-President – Affirmative Action of the IBDC organisation, was a founding father of the indigenisation and black economic empowerment of the Zimbabwean economy alongside similar business moguls and tycoons as Ben Mucheche (President), John Mapondera (Former President), Strive Masiyiwa, Chemist Siziba (former president), Jane Mutasa (IBWO), and James Makamba. This group worked on indigenisation laws with the support of the President Robert Mugabe, Vice-Presidents Simon Muzenda and Joshua Nkomo which formed the basis of the Indigenisation and Economic Empowerment Act of 2007.

Death 

Mkondo, was in the intensive care unit (ICU) post surgery for a month, whilst awaiting for his multi-disciplinary international medical consultants to medically air transport him to the reputable Milpark Hospital for stabilization first in South Africa, but their efforts were delayed by the local team. Mkondo died on 9 May 2013, in a Harare private hospital called Avenues Clinic in Zimbabwe.

Legacy 

Paul Mkondo was the first African insurance executive and financial advisor to be recognised with the elite Life Million Dollar Roundtable International (MDRT). In new independent Zimbabwe he officially represented Zimbabwe and presented the new flag to the MDRT Organization with the blessings of the first Prime Minister of Zimbabwe H. E. Robert Mugabe nicknamed Jongwe. He was also on the MDRT standing committee. Mkondo was the first African President of the Life underwriters association.

Mkondo with VaMutanga were the first pioneering African Indigenous Businessman in Rhodesia to establish a licensed Restaurant and Night Club backed by Amai Mutanga’s Blessing and Prayers.

 Mkondo was also the First African International Music Promoter In Highfields in the 60s.

The protagonist, Simbai Saul Muhondo, in Samuel Chimsoro's novel 'Nothing is impossible' is based on Mkondo's biography (the period from Mkondo’s Birth to 1983 when book was also published). The book was well received and became part of the national education syllabus in English literature during the 80’s without people knowing that it was based on Mkondo’s life.

'Money and Life' (Unpublished Autobiography - Under Arbitration).

References 

1945 births
2013 deaths
Alumni of Keele University
People from Wedza District
20th-century Zimbabwean businesspeople
People from Masvingo Province
People from Harare
Businesspeople in insurance
Rhodesian businesspeople
University of Zimbabwe alumni